Ratna Bhagwandas Chawla is a politician of the Pakistan Peoples Party and the first Hindu woman elected to the Senate of Pakistan.

References 

Members of the Senate of Pakistan
Pakistani Hindus
Year of birth missing (living people)
Living people
Pakistan People's Party politicians